Triller, Inc is an American company specializing in online video, social media, and combat sports. It is named after, and is the owner of, the eponymous social networking service Triller; which was launched in 2015 by co-founders David Leiberman and Sammy Rubin.

History
On March 9, 2021, Triller acquired Verzuz.

On April 14, 2021, Triller acquired video streaming service FITE TV, and customer engagement service Amplify.at.

On November 22, 2021, Triller acquired influencer event firm Thuzio.

On December 22, 2021, Triller announced its intention to merge with SeaChange International and go public. Under the terms of the deal, Triller shareholders would own at least 97.7% of the combined company. The transaction is expected to close in the second quarter of 2022. It was later announced that the combined entity would be renamed TrillerVerz Company upon the merger's closure. On June 14, 2022, it was reported that Triller would back out of the merger with SeaChange in order to pursue an IPO without a merger

On February 24, 2022, Triller acquired a majority stake in the Bare Knuckle Fighting Championship.

Assets

Streaming services
FITE TV 
TrillerTV

Social media
Triller
Cliqz

Combat sports
Bare Knuckle Fighting Championship
Triller Fight Club
Pillow Fight Championship

Other brands and properties
List of other brands and properties owned by Triller, Inc
Thuzio
Verzuz
Amplify.AI
Fangage
Crosshype
Julius
Flipps Media
Metaverz

References

2015 introductions
Bare Knuckle Fighting Championship
Boxing organizations
Internet properties established in 2015
Music industry
Online content distribution
Social networking services
Social media companies of the United States
Streaming media systems
Subscription video streaming services